Robin Bell (born 1979) is an American multimedia visual artist currently residing and working out of Washington, DC.

Artwork 
Although trained as a printmaker, Bell has become better known for his fine arts video work as a projectionist, which over the years has been exhibited/projected at a wide and diverse set of venues, such as The Hollywood Bowl, Artomatic, the Kennedy Center, the Phillips Collection and others.

Bell began gaining national and international attention upon President Trump's election, when he focused his projection work to deliver highly negative political messages in various "unauthorized" venues such as the Trump International Hotel in Washington, D.C. Referencing that particular projection in 2017, The Los Angeles Times noted that it "began to go viral on social media almost as it was happening."

According to The Washington City Paper, these political projections "unlocked" the path to his first solo show at former Corcoran Gallery of Art in Washington, DC, and as noted by the Associated Press: "His work has turned into an unexpected business opportunity. Activist groups have paid his crew to travel as far away as Finland to project images on prominent buildings." In 2019, The New York Times art critic Jillian Steinhauer noted that Bell's projections veer "closer to propaganda than art."

References

External links 
Official Website

Artists from Washington, D.C.
American digital artists
American video artists
American multimedia artists
20th-century American artists
21st-century American artists
American political activists
Political artists
Projectionists
1979 births
Living people